Guido Winterberg (born 19 October 1962) is a Swiss former professional racing cyclist. He rode in five editions of the Tour de France.

References

External links
 

1962 births
Living people
People from Sursee District
Swiss male cyclists
Sportspeople from the canton of Lucerne
Tour de Suisse stage winners